Goudkust is a Dutch televisies series, which was broadcast by SBS 6. When SBS 6 was not happy about the results of the series, it sold the series to FOX 8. When FOX in 2001 sold FOX 8 to SBS Broadcasting the series was aired on NET 5, where the series stopped, something that SBS 6 did two years earlier.

Cast

A
Vastert van Aardenne - Thomas van Zuylen (1997-1998)
Antoinette Akkerman - Verpleegster Els (1996)
Judith Ansems - Simone van Aemstel (1999)
Ingeborg Ansing - Alexandra Visser (2001)
Josefine van Asdonk - Irene Verweijden  (#1)  (1996-2000)
Viviënne van den Assem - Sophie Bergman (2000-2001)

B
 Femke Bakker - Angelique de Haas
 Suzanne Becht - Studente Marieke (1996)
 Antoinette van Belle - Isabel de Hondt
 Alexander van Bergen - Dirk Bisschop (1997)
 Ferdinand Biesheuvel - Bas Karels (1996) / Hans Mathijssen (1997)
 Tjeerd Bisschoff - Ben Bijlsma
 Joost Boer - Bert Zoomers (1996-1999) / Joris Zoomers (1999)
 Marit van Bohemen - Bianca Sterman (1997)
 Fleur Bok - Arlette (1996)
 Filip Bolluyt - Henri van Cloppenburg (#2) (1998-2001)
 Ron Christian Boom - Tuinman Henk (1996)
 Corine Boon - Emma Verkuil (1997-2000)
 Robert Borremans - Pierre Laroux (1996)
 Froukje de Both - Mariët Zoomers (#2) (1997-2001)
 Chip Bray - Jimmy Belvedere
 Esmée de la Bretonière - Irene Verweijden (#2) (2000-2001)
Femke-Anna Broere - Mariët Zoomers (#1) (1996-1997)
 Koert-Jan de Bruijn - Beer van Nispen (2001)

C
 Anne Cavadino - Yvette van Cloppenburg (#1) (1996)
 Mohammed Chaara - Samir Amarani  (#2)  (2000-2001)
 Hans Cornelissen - Huibrecht van Zuylen (1996, 1997)
 Gerda Cronie - Mavis Zuidgeest (2000)

D
 Roemer Daalderop - Theo van Hoorn (1996)
 Iwan Dam - Rein Veltkamp (2000)
 Joost Demmers - Robin van Mijnsbergen (1996)
 Lucas Dietens - Gerard Hardebol (1996-1997)
 Nova van Dijk - Coosje Verkerk (1998)
 Jaap van Donselaar - Johannes van Deventer (1996)
Harold Dückers - Marc Visser (1996-1999)
Mylène Duijvestein - Marianne van der Sluis (1996)

E
 Rein Edzard - Lucas Piersma (1996-1997)
Maureen Eerdmans - Lisa Zoomers (1996-1999, 2000)

F
 Elcon Fleur - Junior Zuidgeest (1999-2001)

G
 Winston Gerschtanowitz - Harm van Cloppenburg (#1) (1996-2000)
 Madeleine Gibson - Tineke van Deventer (1996-1997)
 Roger Goudsmit - Guido Bierkens (1996-1997)
 Metta Gramberg - Eline Kervezee (1998)
 Ezra van Groningen - Ralph Seebregts (1998-2000)
 Theo de Groot - Norbert Zwaardman (1999)

H
 Marc Hazewinkel - Maurits Odijk
 Hans van Hechten - Benno Post
 Sander de Heer - Robert van Galen (1996) / David Bergman (2000)
 Inger van Heijst - Fie Hardebol (1996-1997)
 Pim van den Heuvel - Wethouder van Sterkenburg (1996)
 Mike Ho Sam Sooi - Aaron Zuidgeest  (#1)  (1999-2000)
 Ad Hoeymans - Harold Lohman (1996-1997)
 Jannie Houweling - Marie-Louise Zilverbergh (1996-1997)
 Guido van Hulzen - Ron Lohman (1996-1997)

J
 Eric Jorrin - Alex

K
 Norbert Kaart - Brian Wiggers
 Maiko Kemper - Erik van Overeem (1997-1998, 2000 (gast))
 Adriënne Kleiweg - Mary Zoomers (1996-1999, 2000)
 Mark Kleuskens - Walter de Jonge
 Melvyn de Kom - Menno Landvreugd
 Betje Koolhaas - Yvette van Cloppenburg (#2) (1997-2000)
 Anke Kranendonk - Johanna Stapper (1996)
 Arnost Kraus - Harm van Cloppenburg (#2) (2000-2001)
 Michael Kroegman - Daan van der Meulen (2000)
 Marc Krone - Ad Bleerick (1996)
 Cis Kuipers - Huishoudster Mieke (1996)
 Anke Kranendonk - Johanna Stapper (1996)
 Roel Kyvelos - Nick Sterman  (#1)  (1997-2000)

L
 Joost Laterveer - Peter Kempenaar
 Annemarieke Leeuwenkamp - Lerares Antheunissen (1996)
 Lieke van Lexmond - Eva Prins (1998-2001)
 Kees van Lier - Conciërge Pol (1996)
 Eugène Ligtvoet - Cor Koopman
 Stan Limburg - Hans de Jong (1996)
 Carla Lipp - Therese Segaar (2000)
 Ingeborg Loedeman - Willemijn Laroux (1996)
 David van Lunteren - Lennart Uytt den Boogert (1996-1997)

M
 Angelique Marshall - Joyce Zuidgeest (2000)
 Tim Meeuws - Detective Hoogland  (#1)  (1996)
 Timon Moll - Michiel van den Brink (1996, 1997-2001)
 Antje Monteiro - Sandra van Steen (1996)
 Alex Mous - Police officier Bos (1996) / Detective LaFleur (1997)

N
 Jan Nonhof - Elmer de Bock (1996)

O
 Richard Oerlemans - Joost van den Abeelen (1998-1999)
 Valentijn Ouwens - Detective Hoogland  (#2)  (1996)

P
 Lex Passchier - Gijs Verdonk (1997)
 Hertje Peeck - Dokter van der Meer (1996, 1997)
 Peter Post - Roeland de Brauw (1998)
 Joris Putman - Tijmen Visser (2001)

R
 Roelant Radier - Oscar van Cloppenburg  (#1)  (1996)
 Mark Ram - Dennis (1996)
 Julian Rief - Gerant Bob
 Robin Rienstra - PK van Nispen (2000-2001)
 Yvonne Ristie - Cecilia Landvreugd
 Maja Robbesom - Jasmijn van Oosteinde
 Nienke Römer - Natasja Laroux (1996)

S
 Klaartje de Schepper - Sasha Lindeboom
 Bob Schwarze - Jan Willem Coolhaas
 Truus te Selle - Eugénie d'Harencourt (1996-1997)
 Jasmine Sendar - Bibi Zuidgeest (1999-2001)
 John Serkei - Aaron Zuidgeest  (#2)  (2000-2001)
 Wim Serlie - Huisbaas Wilmink (1997)
 Monique Sluyter - Maria Weevers (1998-1999)
 Koen Smit - Jeroen van Cloppenburg (1999-2001)
 Ella Snoep - Rita de Brink (1997)
 Guy Sonnen - Maurice d'Harencourt (1996)
 Cees Spanbroek - Onderdirecteur De Vries (1996) / Herman Veerman
 Jan Willem Sterneberg - Charles van Dam (1996-1997)
 Machteld Stolte - Brenda de Mol

T
 Ronald Top - Olivier van Eeden
 Bob van Tol - Anton Verweijden (1996-1997)

V
 Noah Valentyn - Samir Amarani  (#1)  (2000)
 Else Valk - Françoise Veeren (1996)
 Ellemieke Vermolen - Bo Donkers 
 René Vernout - Wethouder van Amerongen (1996) / Oscar van Cloppenburg  (#2) 
 Chris Vinken - Bart Harding
 Leonid Vlassov - Konstantin Kolchev (1996, 1997)
 Marianne Vloetgraven - Sylvia Verweijden (1996-2000)
 David Vos - Docent van Ramesdonk (1996)
 Colin Vosveld - Nick Sterman  (#2)  (2000)

W
 Rutger Weemhoff - Henri van Cloppenburg (#1) (1996-1998)
 Dick Wempe - Butler Edward (1996-2001)
 Willem Westermann - Jan-Willem Dekker (1996)
 Rense Westra - Werner Heemskerk
 Daan Wijnands - Stan Mulder (1997)
 Ingrid Willemse - Hannah van Duynhoven 
 Gepke Witteveen - Desirée van Cloppenburg (1996-2001)
 Dick Woudenberg - Benjamin Frederikse (1996)
 Edgar Wurfbain - Pieter Hardebol (1996-1999)

Z
 Michiel de Zeeuw - Tim d'Harencourt (1996-2000)
 Emmelie Zipson - Esther de Blauw
 Herman Zumpolle - Van Veen (1996)
 Hans Zuydveld - Kees Willemse (1996-1997) / Bernhard de Graaf

DVD

Dutch television soap operas
1990s Dutch television series
1996 Dutch television series debuts
2001 Dutch television series endings
SBS6 original programming